Binotto is a surname. Notable people with the surname include:

John Binotto (1919–2016), American football player
Jonatan Binotto (born 1975), Italian footballer
Mattia Binotto (born 1969), Swiss-Italian engineer and sportive functionary 

Italian-language surnames